Olga Sokolova (born 26 December 1969 in Russia) is a Russian road racing cyclist. She won a gold medal at the UCI Road World Championships in the team time trial in 1993 and 1994.

References

External links
 

1969 births
Living people
Soviet female cyclists
Russian female cyclists
UCI Road World Champions (women)
Place of birth missing (living people)